Police Lines School and College, Rangpur is a non-government educational institution in Rangpur District, Bangladesh.This institution is located in the heart of Rangpur city. This institution is controlled by the police force of Rangpur district. It was initially established in 1986. It is the biggest Police Lines School and College in Bangladesh.

Location
Honuman Tola Road (beside Rangpur zoo), Rangpur City, Bangladesh.
Located on the midst of greenery of the historical Police Hall, Collectorate Maidan, Shurovi Garden, Rangpur Zoo, Cricket Garden and Rangpur Stadium as well as Rangpur Government College.

Academic buildings

The institution has two different multistoried buildings. One is used for primary school activities and another building is used for higher school and college activities.

Campus 
The library of PLSCR was established in 1986 at the time of establishment of the institution. It has a collection of around 50,000 books. There are three sports filed in this institution.

Curriculum 
The syllabus of every class is made by the teachers of this institution according to the rules of Board of Intermediate and Secondary Education, Dinajpur. Medium of instruction is Bengali. The students of class IX, X and SSC have to participate in the laboratory workout as well as theory classes. Three semester exam is taken in a year. These are first, second and final semester. If a student fails in the final exam he will not be promoted in the next class. The students of class V, VIII & X have to participate in Primary Ending Exam, Junior School Certificate Exam & Secondary School Certificate Exam.

Extra-curricular activities 
This school is renowned for not only education but also extra-curricular activities. It won the national championship of cricket, football and hockey for several times. It has a large playground where the students can make practice of different games. Many inter-city & inter-school Cricket & Football tournament is held on the field of this school throughout the year. There are also the activities of Rover Scout, Red Crescent at this institution.[1] Every year the authority arrange sporting events in the school field.

Academics 
Police Lines School and College Rangpur offers PEC, JSC, SSC and HSC

SSC and HSC Groups

Science
Business Studies
Humanities

Professors Departments

Department of Management
Department of Accounting
Department of English
Department of Bengali
Department of Botany
Department of Chemistry
Department of Economics
Department of History
Department of Islamic History and Culture
Department of Mathematic
Department of Physics
Department of Zoology

Organizations 
Police Lines School and College has various types of social organizations to
implement its student skill.

•Red Crescent 
•Rover Scout
•Cultural Club
•Debating Club
•English Club
•Science Club

Admission 
In January the school takes students in class III, V, VI and IX. The intake is class III-140, V-140, Class VI-140 & Class IX-60.Students have to qualify in a highly competitive admission test in order to get admitted in this school. Only 15% can admit in the school of the total applicants.

References

External links 
 
https://www.police.gov.bd/

1986 establishments in Bangladesh
Colleges in Rangpur District
Educational institutions established in 1986
Schools in Rangpur District